Jinguofortisidae is an extinct family of early pygostylian avialans known from the Early Cretaceous, found in northern China.

Description
The Jinguofortisidae are distinguished from other non-ornithothoracine avialans by the following features: the scapula and coracoid fused into a scapulocoracoid; a boomeranged-shaped furcula without a hypocleidium; proximal margin of humerus concave centrally; deltopectoral crest large and not perforated; minor metacarpal markedly bowed caudally; alular digit terminating at the level of the distal end of major metacarpal; and proximal phalanx of the major digit longer than the intermediate phalanx.

Phylogeny
Wang et al. (2018) erected Jinguofortisidae after finding Chongmingia (previously considered Avebrevicauda incertae sedis by Wang et al. 2016) to be sister to their new taxon Jinguofortis.

In 2023, a third jinguofortisid was described by Li et al. They recovered their new taxon, Cratonavis, as the sister taxon to Chongmingia. The results of their phylogenetic analyses are shown in the cladogram below:

References

Prehistoric avialans
Prehistoric dinosaur families
Early Cretaceous birds of Asia
Valanginian first appearances
Early Cretaceous extinctions